Myxothiazol is a chemical compound produced by the myxobacterium Myxococcus fulvus.  It is an inhibitor of the mitochondrial cytochrome bc1 complex (coenzyme Q - cytochrome c reductase).

Myxothiazol is a competitive inhibitor of ubiquinol, and binds at the quinol oxidation (Qo) site of the bc1 complex, blocking electron transfer to the Rieske iron-sulfur protein. Binding of myxothiazol induces a red-shift to the visible absorption spectrum of reduced haem bl. In contrast to stigmatellin, myxothiazol does not form a hydrogen bond to the Rieske iron-sulfur protein, binding instead in the 'b-proximal' region of the cytochrome b Qo site. Movement of the cytoplasmic domain of the Rieske protein is therefore unaffected by the binding of this inhibitor.

References

Enzyme inhibitors
Thiazoles